Arturo Lanteri (1891–1975) was an Argentine cartoonist and film director. As a comics artist he is best remembered for his series Les Aventuras de Negro Raúl, Don Pancho Talero and Anacleto.

Filmography
Director
 Pancho Talero en Hollywood  (1931)
   (1930)
   (1929)

Writer
 Pancho Talero en Hollywood  (1931)
   (1930)
   (1929)
Producer
 Pancho Talero en Hollywood  (1931)
   (1930)

References

1891 births
1975 deaths
Argentine film directors
Argentine cartoonists
Argentine comics artists